A list of American films released in 1956
Around the World in 80 Days won the Academy Award for Best Picture.

A-B

C-D

E-I

J-M

N-R

S-Z

See also
 1956 in the United States

Sources

Footnotes

References

External links

1956 films at the Internet Movie Database

1956
Films
Lists of 1956 films by country or language